The Office Girls is two prominent rock nunataks along an ice cliff, situated 7 nautical miles (13 km) southwest of Welcome Mountain in the Outback Nunataks. Mapped by United States Geological Survey (USGS) from surveys and U.S. Navy air photos, 1959–64. Named by Advisory Committee on Antarctic Names (US-ACAN) to express appreciation for the dedicated support provided to Antarctic programs by home-based personnel.

Nunataks of Victoria Land
Pennell Coast